Waydown Wailers are an American blues, rock, swamp rock, and Americana band composed of brothers Dave and Christian Parker, Michael (Scruffy) Scriminger, Joey Thomas, and Connor Pelkey. Their album, Backland Blues (2018), was well received  and topped out at #5 on the Blues Rock Chart. The musical group has toured extensively in the Northeastern US and has been the opening act for Lady Antebellum, The Charlie Daniels Band, and Jerrod Niemann, among others.

Music career
Waydown Wailers were formed in 2011. Brothers, David Parker (guitar/vocals) and Christian Parker (guitar) joined up with Michael (Scruffy) Scriminger (drums) and later Connor Pelkey (bass) and Joe Thomas (keyboards/guitar/vocals) joined the band. The musical group has toured extensively in the Northeastern US and has released three studio albums with songs charting on the blues and blues rock charts.

Albums
 2013 - State of the Union - produced by Professor (Aaron L. Hurwitz) Louie on Woodstock Records
 2016 - Empty Promises - produced by Professor Louie on Woodstock Records - was on the Grammy nomination ballot for Best Americana Album. Their song Jealousy, was on the ballot for Best Americana Roots Song, and their cover of the Creedence Clearwater Revival song, Susie Q, was on the ballot for Best Americana Roots Performance.
 2018 - Backland Blues - produced by Professor Louie on Woodstock Records 
Radio Airplay
 Whiskey and Cornbread (Empty Promises) charted at #17 IndieWorld Country Record Report - October 14, 2016
 Backland Blues charted at # 5 on the Blues Rock Album chart on June 23, 2018 charted at #7 on The New York Blues chart on January 1, 2019.

References

American blues rock musical groups
American southern rock musical groups